Maraton, in some languages Maratone and Maratón is a variant of Marathon 

Maraton may refer to:
Maratón (film), 1968 Czechoslovak film directed by Ivo Novák	
Maratone Studios, music production company based in Sweden
Maraton (album), album by Swedish singer Alina Devecerski
Maratón Alpino Madrileño, trail running race that takes place on Sierra de Guadarrama, in Madrid, Spain

See also
Marathon (disambiguation)
 Tendai Maraton Monks, Japanese monks of Mt. Hiel known for Kaihōgyō, set of the ascetic physical endurance trainings